Wretch is the first full-length album by American rock band Kyuss, released in September 1991. The tracks "Black Widow" and "Deadly Kiss" are taken from the band's debut EP, Sons of Kyuss (1990), recorded with original bassist Chris Cockrell, while the rest of the album was recorded with his replacement Nick Oliveri. The Sons of Kyuss songs "Love Has Passed Me By", "Katzenjammer", and "Isolation Desolation" were re-recorded for Wretch, the latter's title shortened to "Isolation".

Track listing
Writing credits adapted from the album's liner notes.

Personnel
Credits adapted from the album's liner notes.

Kyuss
 John Garcia – vocals, producer
 Josh Homme – guitar, producer
 Brant Bjork – drums, producer
 Nick Oliveri – bass on all tracks except "Black Widow" and "Deadly Kiss", producer
 Chris Cockrell – bass on "Black Widow" and "Deadly Kiss"

Production
 Catherine Enny – producer
 Ron Krown – producer
 J.B. Lawrence – recording engineer
 Chris Fuhrman – mixing engineer of all tracks except "Black Widow" and "Deadly Kiss"
 Michael Mikulka – mixing engineer of "Black Widow" and "Deadly Kiss"
 Carol Hibbs – mastering engineer

Artwork
 Harlan Williams – layout, design
 NTS – art direction
 Mark Cieslikowski – back cover photograph

References

Kyuss albums
1991 debut albums